Victor Mikhaylovich Baluda (born 30 September 1992) is a Russian tennis player playing on the ATP Challenger Tour. In September 2013, he reached his highest ATP singles ranking of World No. 290 and achieved his highest doubles ranking of No. 115 in August 2014.

Future and Challenger finals

Singles: 12 (6–6)

Doubles 18 (9–9)

External links
 

1992 births
Living people
Russian male tennis players
Tennis players from Moscow
Tennis players at the 2010 Summer Youth Olympics
Universiade medalists in tennis
Universiade silver medalists for Russia
Universiade bronze medalists for Russia
Medalists at the 2013 Summer Universiade